The first season of the television series HaShminiya was originally broadcast on Arutz HaYeladim (HOT) in Israel.

Season overview
Amos Dvir, Avner HaLevy and Roberto, three scientists, investigate cerebral energy called "The Lambda Ripples". They want to have an experiment that will include six amnestied kids. After that development, Avner and Amos decide to delay it for some years. Disappointed, Roberto is co-operating with Lillie Dvir, Amos' wife, and these two operate the experiment on Amos and Lillie's kids, three-year-old Maya and Jonathan. It doesn't work and explodes, but the kids stay alive. Roberto is going to jail for six years and Lillie is leaving Israel after divorcing Amos.

The show starts seven years later. Amos is dying of cancer, so he decides urge his kids into adolescence – to the age of fifteen with his machine Turbo-Time, which can change your age, and changes their names to Aya and Nini. Avner raises a project for amnestied students and Amos is asking him to attach Aya and Nini to the project. Amos is flying to medical treatments in Switzerland, while Aya and Nini think he's dead.

Avner forms "The Octette" and recruits eight amnestied students to investigate the ripples. In addition to solving riddles and saving the countries and themselves from hostile forces, the octette is acting like a similar class with loves and friendships: Aya and Adam are in love at first sight. Nini and Roni and Mika and Avi are becoming couples too. Surprisingly, Lillie is coming back from abroad to raise her children. At the same time, she and Roberto are co-operating and follow the project to avenge Amos and Avner.

A substitute teacher named Dedi joins the school and begins a relationship with Dganit, the class's teacher. At the same time Lillie gains control of the prjocet and is ready to use the octette like batteries and pump the lambda energy from them. Lillie threatens the octette, almost kills Adam and Dganit, goes to jail and disappoints her two kids. Aya and Nini are shocked to know that her father is alive, and he is a person that they knew so far as their history teacher – Dedi. In spite of the project's success, Avner and Dganit decide to end it because risk to the students and a possible exposure of the project. The students scattered in couples all over the classes. Dganit and her son Ben-Ben move to Dedi, Nini and Aya's place. The season ends when Nini is returning to be Jonathan and Aya is having doubts, when Adam is asking not to do this.

Episodes

{| class="wikitable plainrowheaders" style="width:100%; margin:auto; background:#FFFFFF;"
|-
! style="background-color: #0000FF; color:#FFF; text-align: center;" width="35"|Series# 
!! style="background-color: #0000FF; color:#FFF; text-align: center;" width="35"|Season# 
!! style="background-color: #0000FF; color:#FFF; text-align: center;"|Title
!! style="background-color: #0000FF; color:#FFF; text-align: center;" width="140"|Original airdate
|-
!colspan="4;" style="background-color: #0000FF; color: #FFF"| Part 1

!colspan="4;" style="background-color: #0000FF; color: #FFF"| Part 2

|}

2005 Israeli television seasons
Split television seasons